Kevin Johio Lucas Rehn Eires, known professionally as Yohio, stylized as YOHIO (born July 12, 1995) is a Swedish singer and songwriter currently active in Japan. He is best known for his performances as Yohio, wearing a lolita dress in previous years, with an androgynous appearance on stage. He is a former member of the Swedish rock band Seremedy, which disbanded in April 2013. Yohio has participated in Melodifestivalen both in 2013 and 2014, making it to the final on both occasions. He is one of the co-founders and current CEO of Keios Entertainment.

Family and early life
Yohio was born in Stockholm, Sweden on 12 July 1995 and is the son of Tommy Rehn of the Swedish heavy metal band Corroded, and Johanna Eires. Shortly after, his family moved to Sundsvall, where he grew up. When he was six years old he started learning to play the piano, and later learned the guitar at age eleven. He wrote his first song when he was six years old.

He is the grandson of Jan-Eric Rehn, who was a guitarist in 1960s band The Panthers and the nephew of Chris Rehn of Swedish post-grunge/pop rock band Takida. Chris and Tommy Rehn were also both in the band Angtoria. Yohio speaks Japanese, after becoming interested in Japanese culture and visual kei at a young age, and also spending time in Japan on his several trips to the country performing his music.

Career in Sweden
Yohio and his band Seremedy gained some recognition in Sweden starting in 2011. The band consisted of lead vocalist SEIKE, YOHIO on lead guitar, Ray on guitar, JENZiiH on bass and LINDER on drums. The band released their first EP Seasons Will Change in 2011  and their first album Welcome to our Madness on July 25, 2012. The band then broke up and made a one time return for a last live show and EP Re:Madness on September 20, 2014.

Yohio received special attention for wearing a dress when performing. In 2012 Yohio released his first English song as a solo performer, "Our Story". Yohio has made four music videos – for "Sky Limit", "Our Story", "Heartbreak Hotel" (his entry for Melodifestivalen 2013) and "Revolution".
 	
In 2013, it was announced that Yohio was lending his voice to a Vocaloid voicebank within the PowerFX range that contains both an English and Japanese vocal. He provided the voicebank for YOHIOloid.

Melodifestivalen 2013
Yohio was one of the contestants in the 2013 edition of Melodifestivalen, the Swedish national selection for the Eurovision Song Contest 2013 to be held in Malmö. His song was "Heartbreak Hotel", which he wrote along with Johan Fransson, Tobias Lundgren, Tim Larsson and Henrik Göranson. On February 2, Yohio was qualified for the contest's finals. Soon after, on the 9th of March, he came second place with Robin Stjernberg leading him as the final winner with 166 points. Yohio earned 133 points with his successful song; Heartbreak Hotel. Yohio was the Swedish spokesperson and announcer of the Swedish voting result at the 2013 Eurovision final in Malmö.

Melodifestivalen 2014
Yohio took part in the first heat of Melodifestivalen 2014 at the Malmö Arena with the song "To the End", performing first. Yohio was announced as the first act to go directly to the final at the Friends Arena on 8 March. In the final, he came in sixth place.

DISREIGN
Yohio formed a new band that consists of Valentin on guitar, Tias on drums and former Seremedy bandmate, JENZiiH on bass. They released their first single and PV Until The Fade on May 8, 2015 and released the single worldwide on August 5, 2015. The PV was directed by Die/may band member Riotcolor. This marked Yohio's return to a band and his return to singing in Japanese since Shiraha in 2015.

Producing career
Yohio has mixed a song for former Seremedy bandmate Seike's band Die/May single The Return, making this their first time working together since the break up of Seremedy (before the reunion in 2014) Yohio also wrote the lyrics to the song "I'm Sorry" tweeting "Writing some R&B right now for another artist. Not my territory at all, but very interesting to create. Love how you can play with vocals!" The song was sung by Oskar Bruzell.

Career in Japan
In 2012, Yohio released his first EP "Reach the Sky" in Japan, which placed 82nd on Oricon. His first album, Break the Border was released in June, 2013, three months after the Swedish release. It entered the Oricon weekly charts on one occasion, at position 285.

Discography

Studio albums

EPs

Singles

DVDs

References

External links 
 
 https://www.keios.co/yohio

1995 births
21st-century Swedish male singers
21st-century Swedish singers
English-language singers from Sweden
Living people
Singers from Stockholm
Swedish pop singers
Vocaloid voice providers
Male-to-female cross-dressers
Melodifestivalen contestants of 2014
Melodifestivalen contestants of 2013